The International Socialist Organisation (ISO) is a Trotskyist group in Germany. It was established in December 2016 by the merger of the organizations International Socialist Left and the Revolutionary Socialist League. The group forms the section of the Fourth International in Germany. Members of the ISO work in the broad-based democratic socialist party Die Linke, and publish Sozialistische Zeitung.

References

External links
 
Sozialistische Zeitung website 

2016 establishments in Germany
Fourth International (post-reunification)
Political organizations established in 2016
The Left (Germany)
Trotskyist organisations in Germany